A list of windmills in the Belgian province of Hainaut.

Notes
Bold indicates a mill that is still standing. Italics indicates a mill with some remains surviving.

Buildings and structures in Hainaut (province)
Tourist attractions in Hainaut (province)
Hainaut